The Shoot 'Em Up Kid is a 1926 American short silent Western film directed by Hoot Gibson and starring Fred Gilman and Dorothy Gulliver.

Cast
 Fred Gilman - Terry Moore
 Dorothy Gulliver -
 Ida Tenbrook - 
 Jim Corey -

References

External links
  The Shoot 'Em Up Kid at IMDb.com

1926 films
Films directed by Hoot Gibson
American silent short films
1926 Western (genre) films
American black-and-white films
1926 short films
Silent American Western (genre) films
1920s American films
1920s English-language films